The 1985 LPGA Tour was the 36th season since the LPGA Tour officially began in 1950. The season ran from January 24 to November 10. The season consisted of 35 official money events. Nancy Lopez won the most tournaments, five. She also led the money list with earnings of $416,472.

There were five first-time winners in 1985: Kathy Baker, Judy Clark, Penny Hammel, Val Skinner, and Muffin Spencer-Devlin. The season saw the last of JoAnne Carner's 43 LPGA wins and Kathy Whitworth's record 88 LPGA wins.

The tournament results and award winners are listed below.

Tournament results
The following table shows all the official money events for the 1985 season. "Date" is the ending date of the tournament. The numbers in parentheses after the winners' names are the number of wins they had on the tour up to and including that event. Majors are shown in bold.

Awards

References

External links
LPGA Tour official site
1985 season coverage at golfobserver.com

LPGA Tour seasons
LPGA Tour